Ramgarh Sardaran is a village in Punjab state of India. It is situated 18 km from its tehsil (sub-district headquarter) Payal and approx. 40 km from its district ludhiana. As per 2014 stats, Ramgarh Sardaran village is also a gram panchayat.

Geography
The village is located near to Malaudh and just 2 km from patiala-ludhiana highway. The total geographical area of village is approx. 851 hectares.

Climate 

Ramgarh Sardaran experiences three main seasons. They are:
 Hot season (mid-April to the end of June)
 Rainy season (early July to the end of September)
 Cold season (early December to the end of February).
Apart from these three, this village experiences transitional seasons like:
 Pre-summer season (March to mid-April): This is the period of transition between winter and summer.
 Post-monsoon season (September to end of November): This is the period of transition between monsoon and winter seasons.

Summer 
It starts experiencing mildly hot temperatures in February. However, the actual summer season commences in mid-April. The area experiences pressure variations during the summer months. The atmospheric pressure of the region remains around 987 millibar during February and it reaches 970 millibar in June.

Rainy season 
The monsoon brings joy to the agricultural sector as farmers become very busy. The  rainy season begins in first week of July as monsoon currents generated in the Bay of Bengal bring rain to the region.

Winter 
Temperature variation is minimal in January. The mean night and day temperatures fall to 5 °C (41 °F) and 12 °C (54 °F), respectively.

Post-Monsoon transitional season 
The monsoon begins to reduce by the second week of September. This brings a gradual change in climate and temperature. The time between October and November is the transitional period between monsoon and winter seasons. Weather during this period is generally fair and dry.

Post-Winter transitional season 
The effects of winter diminish by the first week of March. The hot summer season commences in mid-April. This period is marked by occasional showers with hail storms and squalls which cause extensive damage to crops. The winds remain dry and warm during the last week of March, commencing the harvest period.

Rainfall 
 Monsoon Rainfall
Monsoon season provides most of the rainfall for the region. Ramgarh Sardaran receives rainfall from the monsoon current of the Bay of Bengal. This monsoon current enters the state from the southeast in the first week of July.
 Winter Rainfall
The winter season remains very cool with temperatures falling below freezing at some places. Winter also brings in some western disturbances. Rainfall in the winter provides relief to the farmers.

Connectivity of Ramgarh Sardaran 

Public Bus service - Direct private buses from malerkotla, Rara Sahib, Ahmedgarh Mandi, Payal.

Demographics
The population is approximately 4426 people living in 813 households.

Religious sites
Guruduwara Baba Sidhsar Sahib
Guruduwara Guru Ravidass Ji
Guruduwara Sahib in main bazaar
Mandir Baba Tota Puri Ji
Mandir Ram Leela 
The Mosque
Shiv Duwala
Dargah Peer Lutaf Shah Ji
Dargah Peer Baba Lalan Wala ji
Baba Gugga Marri
Mandir Hanumaan Ji
Mandir Maata Rani Ji

Education
Govt. Elementary School Ramgarh Sardaran
Govt. High School Ramgarh Sardaran
Baba Deep singh girls college.

Cities and towns in Ludhiana district